Pittsburg is a village in Williamson County, Illinois. The population was 572 at the 2010 census.

History

Pittsburg was established in 1906 as part of a mining operation developed by coal entrepreneur John Colp (for whom nearby Colp is named).  Colp named the village for Pittsburgh, Pennsylvania, as he hoped it would achieve that city's prosperity.  Many of the streets in the village were likewise named for locations in Pennsylvania, including Scranton Avenue, Lehigh Valley Avenue, Hocking Valley Avenue, and Pennsylvania Avenue.  A post office opened in 1907.

Geography
Pittsburg is located at  (37.777805, -88.850327).

Demographics

As of the census of 2000, there were 575 people, 228 households, and 168 families residing in the village. The racial makeup of the village was 98.09% White, 1.22% African American, 0.52% Native American and 0.17% Asian. Hispanic or Latino of any race were 0.17% of the population.

There were 228 households, out of which 30.3% had children under the age of 18 living with them, 61.0% were married couples living together, 8.3% had a female householder with no husband present, and 26.3% were non-families. 24.1% of all households were made up of individuals, and 12.3% had someone living alone who was 65 years of age or older. The average household size was 2.52 and the average family size was 2.96.

In the village, the population was spread out, with 24.5% under the age of 18, 9.4% from 18 to 24, 28.3% from 25 to 44, 23.0% from 45 to 64, and 14.8% who were 65 years of age or older. The median age was 36 years. For every 100 females, there were 111.4 males. For every 100 females age 18 and over, there were 108.7 males.

The median income for a household in the village was $29,722, and the median income for a family was $35,074. Males had a median income of $29,904 versus $17,212 for females. The per capita income for the village was $14,186. About 5.2% of families and 11.3% of the population were below the poverty line, including 24.6% of those under age 18 and 9.3% of those age 65 or over.

References

Villages in Williamson County, Illinois
Villages in Illinois